James Ellis (1763?–1830) was an English lawyer and antiquary.

Ellis was the son of William Ellis, a glover, of Hexham, and was born about January 1763. He practised as a solicitor in Hexham, and then at Newcastle upon Tyne. He was the author of some verses referred to in Moses Aaron Richardson's Table Book. He also had an extensive knowledge of Border history, communicated materials on the subject to Sir Walter Scott, who was sometimes his guest at Otterburne Hall in Northumberland.

Ellis died 25 (or 26) March 1830.

References

Attribution

1763 births
1830 deaths
People from Hexham
18th-century antiquarians
19th-century antiquarians
English antiquarians
18th-century English people
18th-century English writers
18th-century English male writers
19th-century English writers
English lawyers
English male poets
19th-century English male writers
English male non-fiction writers